Level 7 may refer to:

Film and television
"Level Seven", episode of Out of the Unknown, 1966 adaptation of the Roshwald novel by J. B. Priestley
Level Seven, 2008 film by Geraint Wyn Davies

Music
"Level 7", song by D.R.I. from Full Speed Ahead
"Level 7", song by Nashawn, from Nas discography, 2008

Other uses
Level 7 (novel) by Mordecai Roshwald, 1959
Level 7 nuclear accident, meltdown - Chernobyl or Fukushima
Level 7 Diploma, master level education without academic dissertation
Level Seven (hacking group)